The knockout stage of the 2021 Africa Cup of Nations was the second and final stage of the competition, following the group stage. It began on 23 January with the round of 16 and ended on 6 February 2022 with the final held at the Olembe Stadium in Yaoundé. A total of 16 teams (the top two teams from each group, along with the four best third-placed teams) advanced to the knockout stage to compete in a single-elimination style tournament.

All match times are local, WAT (UTC+1).

Format
In the knockout stage, except for the third place play-off, if a match was level at the end of 90 minutes of normal playing time, extra time was played (two periods of 15 minutes each). If still tied after extra time, the match was decided by a penalty shoot-out to determine the winner. In the third place play-off, if the scores remained level after 90 minutes the match would go directly to a penalty shoot-out, without any extra time being played.

Qualified teams
The top two placed teams from each of the six groups, plus the four best-placed third teams, qualified for the knockout stage.

Bracket

Round of 16

Burkina Faso vs Gabon

Nigeria vs Tunisia

Guinea vs Gambia

Cameroon vs Comoros

Senegal vs Cape Verde

Morocco vs Malawi

Ivory Coast vs Egypt

Mali vs Equatorial Guinea

Quarter-finals

Gambia vs Cameroon

Burkina Faso vs Tunisia

Egypt vs Morocco

Senegal vs Equatorial Guinea

Semi-finals

Burkina Faso vs Senegal

Cameroon vs Egypt

Third place match

Final

Notes

References

External links
 

2021 Africa Cup of Nations